Murchadh is masculine given name in the Irish and Scottish Gaelic languages.

Etymology
A Dictionary of First Names, published by Oxford University Press, defines the Irish name as being derived from the Gaelic elements muir, meaning "sea"; and cadh, meaning "battle". In the same book, the Scottish Gaelic name is defined as being a modern form of the Gaelic name Muireadhach, which means "lord", but is said to derive from muir, which means "sea".

Anglicised forms
Anglicised forms of the Scottish Gaelic name are Murdo, Morrow,  and Murdoch.Some Anglicised Surnames in Ireland, Padraic MacGiolla-Domhnaigh (1923) Anglicised forms of the Irish name are Murphy, Morgan and Murrough. As a patronymic surname, Murphy and Morrow are also derived from Murchadh and its patronymics, MacMurchadh and Mac Murchadha

People with the given name

Murchad
Murchad mac Áedo, king of Connacht
Murchad mac Brain Mut (died 727), king of Leinster
Murchad mac Brian Ó Flaithbheartaigh (1419), Irish chieftain
Murchad mac Diarmata, king of Leinster, Dublin, and the Isles
Murchad mac Flaithbertaig (died 767), chief of the Cenél Conaill 
Murchad mac Flann mac Glethneachan (fl. 973), king of Maigh Seóla
Murchad mac Máele Dúin (fl. 819–833), king of Ailech
Murchad Midi (died 715), king of Uisnech
Murchad Ua Flaithbertaig (fl. c.1202-1241), bishop of Annaghdown,
Murchad mac Briain, son of Brian Boru who died at the Battle of Clontarf

Murchadh
Murchadh an Chapail Ua Flaithbheartaigh, (died 1036), a king of Maigh Seóla / Iar Connacht
Murchadh mac Aodha, (died 960), king of Uí Maine
Murchadh mac Maenach (died 891), king of Maigh Seóla
Murchadh mac Sochlachan, (died 936), king of Uí Maine
Murchadh Mac Suibhne, (died 1267), Norse-Gaelic nobleman
Murchadh Ó Cuindlis, (fl. 1398-1411) Irish scribe
Murchadh Ó Madadhain, (fl. 1347-1371), chief of Síol Anmchadha
Murchadh Ó Madadhan, (1327), king of Síol Anmchadha
Murchadh Reagh Ó Madadhan, (d. 1475), chief of Síol Anmchadha

Murdo
Alex Murdo Macleod (1932–2006), Free Church of Scotland minister
Murdo Fraser (born 1965), Scottish politician
Murdo MacDonald, several people
Murdo Macfarlane (1901-1982), Scottish Gaelic poet
Murdo MacKay (1917–2000), Canadian ice hockey player
Murdo Mackay (born 1956), Scottish businessman
Murdo MacKenzie, several people
Murdo MacKenzie (1850–1939), Scottish businessman
Murdo MacKenzie (1835–1912), minister and moderator of the Free Church of Scotland
Murdo Maclean (born 1943), Scottish businessman
Murdo Young McLean (1848–1916), Canadian publisher
Murdo MacLeod, several people
Murdo MacLeod (born 1958), Scottish former professional football player
Murdo MacLeod (born 1947), Scottish professional snooker player
Murdo J. MacLeod, Scottish historian
Murdo Martin (1917–1989), Canadian politician
Murdo McDougall, Scottish football manager 
Murdo Scribe (1920–1983), Swampy Cree educator
Murdo Tait (born 1938), Scottish footballer

See also
List of Irish-language given names

References

Scottish Gaelic masculine given names
Scottish masculine given names
Irish-language masculine given names